Odostomiinae, Odostomia snails and their allies, is a taxonomic subfamily of minute parasitic sea snails. These are marine heterobranch gastropod mollusks, or micromollusks, in the family Pyramidellidae.

Taxonomy
The subfamily Odostomiinae has been recognized as monophyletic.

It includes the tribe Liostomini, a name given to those genera which have an intorted protoconch. The rest of the genera however do not form a single monophyletic taxon.

Subfamily Odostomiinae has been classified as one of eleven recognised subfamilies of the very voluminous gastropod family Pyramidellidae (according to the taxonomy of Ponder & Lindberg 1997): Odostomiinae, Turbonillinae, Chrysallidinae, Cingulininae, Cyclostremellinae, Sayellinae, Syrnolinae, Eulimellinae, Pyramidellinae, Odostomellinae and Tiberiinae.

In the taxonomy of Bouchet & Rocroi (2005), this subfamily  also comprises the subfamilies Chrysallidinae, Cyclostremellinae and Odostomellinae, that they have downgraded to the rank of tribe.

subfamily Odostomiinae Pelseneer, 1928
tribe Odostomiini Pelseneer, 1928
tribe Chrysallidini Saurin, 1958 - formerly subfamily Chrysallidinae
tribe Cyclostremellini D.R. Moore, 1966 - formerly subfamily Cyclostremellinae
tribe Odostomellini Saurin, 1959 - formerly subfamily Odostomellinae

According to Schander, Van Aartsen and Corgan (1999) there are 33 genera in Odostominae with four possible additional genera of uncertain status.

Genera
Genera in the subfamily Odostomiinae include:

tribe Odostomiini
 Odostomia Fleming, 1813 - type genus
 Aartsenia Warén, 1991
 Auristomia Monterosato, 1884
 Boonea
 Brachystomia Monterosato, 1884
 Colpostomia Cossmann, 1921
 Creanatodostomia Nomura, 1937
 Cyclodostomia Sacco, 1892
 Doliella Monterosato, 1880
 Eulimastoma Bartsch, 1916
 Eustomia Cossmann, 1921
 Evalea A. Adams, 1860
 Gumina Finlay, 1928
 Heida Dall,l, 1903
 Jordaniella Chaster, 1898
 Kunopia Laseron, 1959
 Liostomia G. O. Sars, 1878
 Macrodostomia Sacco, 1892
 Marginodostomia Nomura, 1936possible synonyme of Cyclodostomia fide Saurin (1958:64)
 Megastomia Monterosato, 1884
 Nesiodostomia Pilsbry, 1918
 Nisostomia Cossmann, 1921
 Noemiamea De Folin in Hoyle, 1886- have been shown to be a part of Odostomia sensu stricta by Schander and co-workers (2003)
 Obexomia Laws, 1941
 Odetta De Folin, 1870
 Ondina De Folin, 1870
 Pyramistomia Cossmann, 1921
 Sinuatodostomia Nomura, 1937
 Sinustomia Cossmann, 1921
 Striodostomia Laws, 1940
 Turridostomia Habe, 1961
 Villia Dall, & Bartsch, 1904
 Volutaxiella Strebel, 1908

tribe Chrysallidini

tribe Cyclostremellini

tribe Odostomellini

Additional genera
Some additional genera which may belong in the subfamily Odostomiinae are:
 Angustispira Pelseneer, 1912
 Helodiamea Peñas & Rolán, 2017 
 Myxa Hedley, 1903
 Pseudorissoina Tate & May, 1900
 Ugartea Bartsch, 1917

Distribution
This family is found worldwide, from the tropics to the poles.

Shell description
The shell of these snails has a blunt, heterostrophic protoconch, which is often pointed sideways or wrapped up. Most species in the subfamily have shells which are smaller than 13 mm. The texture of these shells is most often smooth but sometimes sculptured in various forms such as ribs and spirals. Their color is mostly white, cream or yellowish, sometimes with red or brown lines. The teleoconch is dextrally coiled, but the larval shells are sinistral. This results in a sinistrally coiled protoconch. The columella has usually one, but sometimes several, spiral folds. The aperture is closed by an operculum.

Life habits
The Odostomiinae are ectoparasites, feeding mainly on other molluscs and on annelid worms, but some are known to feed on peanut worms and crustaceans.

They do not have a radula. Instead their long proboscis is used to pierce the skin of its prey and suck up its fluids and soft tissues. The eyes on the grooved tentacles are situated  toward the base of the tentacles. Between the head and the foot, a lobed process called the mentum ( = thin projection) is visible. These molluscs are hermaphrodites.

References

Pyramidellidae
Protostome subfamilies